Aluf Dan Tolkowsky (or Tolkovsky, ; born January 17, 1921) is a retired Israeli Air Force officer who served as a major general in the Israeli Air Force (IAF) from 1953 to 1958. A noted investor, he helped start the first Israeli venture capital fund.

Education and early life

Tolkowsky was born in Tel Aviv in 1921 to Shmuel Tolkowsky, and was the grandson of Isaac Leib Goldberg. He was educated at the Herzliya Hebrew Gymnasium, and in 1936, he joined the Haganah. In 1938, he went to London to study at Imperial College London and graduated with a B.Sc. in engineering in 1941.

Military service
In 1942 Tolkowsky volunteered for the Royal Air Force. He was part of a group of Palestinian-Jewish RAF pilots sent to train at a flight school in Southern Rhodesia (present day Zimbabwe). He earned his wings in 1943, being the first in his group to complete the course, and went on to serve as a fighter pilot and later in reconnaissance aircraft. He saw action in the Mediterranean theater, Germany, and France. At the end of World War II, he served as a transport pilot, and was later stationed in Palestine at RAF Lydda (now Lod). He was discharged from the RAF in June 1946 with the rank of Flight Lieutenant.

After his discharge, Tolkowsky moved to Britain and worked as a mechanical engineer. In December 1947 he secretly began helping efforts to purchase aircraft for Sherut Avir, the Haganah's air arm and forerunner of the Israeli Air Force. In 1948, a few days before the Israeli Declaration of Independence, Tolkowsky returned to Palestine. He served in the Israeli Air Force during the 1948 Arab-Israeli War, participating in bombing attacks on the Egyptian front.

He was initially discharged from the IAF, but reenlisted in 1951. He first served as Inspector-General, and then as Chief of Staff to the Commander. He was appointed Commander of the IAF in May 1953 and served until July 1958. During his time as commander, the IAF received its first fighter jets and took part in the Suez Crisis. He was seconded to the Israeli Ministry of Defense in 1958-1959. He holds the rank of major-general (Res.) in the Israel Defense Forces.

Civilian life
In 1959 Tolkowsky joined the Discount Bank Investment Corporation  (DBIC), originally an arm of the Bank, later a public company in Israel. He was appointed as Managing Director in 1965 and Vice-Chairman in 1980. Beginning in 1962, DBIC was the first financial institution in Israel to invest in local hi-tech industry. Tolkowsky helped Uzia Galil start the technology holding company Elron Electronic Industries in 1962. In 1985 Tolkowsky, in partnership with his son Gideon and Frederick Adler, a noted American venture capital investor, founded Athena, the first venture fund in Israel, to invest in Israeli  and American ventures, mostly hi-tech, which operated until 1997.

Tolkowsky also held a series of minor government posts. In 1963, he joined the National Council for Research and Development. He served as Chairman of the Subcommittee on Radiation and Radioisotopes of the Israel Atomic Energy Commission. In 1970, he headed a commission of inquiry that investigated an accident at Lod Airport. From 1978-1980 he was a member of the Israel Securities Authority plenum. In 1997, he served on the Ciechanover Commission, which investigated a failed Mossad assassination attempt against Hamas leader Khaled Mashal in Jordan. He also was a member of a committee examining the organizational structure of higher education institutions.

Tolkowsky is a Commandeur of the French Legion d’Honneur (1958), holds a Doctorate Honoris Causa from the Technion Israel Institute of Technology (1980), and holds an award from the joint US-Israel Science and Technology Authority named after Yitzhak Rabin. He is married to Miriam and has a daughter and two sons, Roni, David, and Gideon.

Notes

References
 Jews from Palestine are sent to the RAF pilot course in Rhodesia, IAF Official Site. Accessed June 9, 2006.

1921 births
Living people
Israeli centenarians
Israeli aviators
Israeli Air Force generals
Israeli Jews
Men centenarians
Royal Air Force pilots of World War II
Alumni of Imperial College London
Commandeurs of the Légion d'honneur
20th-century Israeli businesspeople